Little House on the Prairie is a series of American children's novels by Laura Ingalls Wilder, or the media franchise based on it.

Little House on the Prairie may also refer to:

Related to the Ingalls Wilder story
 Little House on the Prairie (novel), the third book of the Little House series
 Little House on the Prairie (film), a 1974 TV movie based on the above book
 Laura, the Prairie Girl, a 1975 animated TV series based on the 1932 and 1935 Little House novels
 Little House on the Prairie (feature film) an upcoming film directed by Sean Durkin
 Little House on the Prairie (musical), a musical adaptation of the books
 Little House on the Prairie (TV series), a 1974–1983 American television series
 Little House on the Prairie (TV miniseries), a 2005 American miniseries
 The Little House Wayside, a rest area in Pepin, Wisconsin

Unrelated
 A nickname for the Stott Hall Farm on the M62 motorway in England

See also
 Beyond the Prairie: The True Story of Laura Ingalls Wilder, a two-part 2000 and 2002 television movie
 Little House (disambiguation)